Ric Bustamante, born 1923, is a Filipino actor who portrayed most of his roles as a villain. His first movie was Tayug (Ang Bayang Api) under Pedro Vera Pictures.

He made many notable films with director Manuel Conde, including the 1950 films Siete Infantes de Lara and Genghis Khan.

He made the 1952 religious film Kalbaryo ni Hesus and the 1951 period film Sigfredo under Lebran Pictures.

He also made four films under Everlasting Pictures: the Babaing Mandarambong, Princesa ng Kagubatan, Taong Putik, and Ramir.

Filmography

References

Filipino male film actors
Living people
Year of birth missing (living people)